Astaillac is a commune in the Corrèze department in the Nouvelle-Aquitaine region of central France.

The inhabitants of the commune are known as Astaillacois or Astaillacoises.

Geography
Astaillac is located some 45 km south-east of Brive-la-Gaillarde and 15 km north by north-west of Saint-Céré. The eastern border of the commune is also the border between the departments of Corrèze and Lot. Access to the commune is by the D41 road from Beaulieu-sur-Dordogne in the north passing through the east of the commune and continuing south-west to Liourdres. The D41E1 comes from the D153E south-west of Sioniac through the commune to the village and continues to the hamlet of La Plaine. Apart from the village there are the hamlets of Conques, Le Soulie, La Plaine, and Cassagne. The commune is mixed forest and farmland.

The Dordogne river forms the eastern border of the commune except for a small area on the left bank which forms part of the commune. The Dordogne flows south and eventually joins the Garonne at Saint-Seurin-de-Bourg. Several streams rise in the commune and flow south-east to join the Dordogne: the Ruisseau de Ganissal, the Ruisseau de Fontanille, the Ruisseau de Laborie, and the Ruisseau de Coucoulogne which forms the western border of the commune.

Neighbouring communes and villages

Heraldry

Administration

List of Successive Mayors

Demography
In 2017 the commune had 232 inhabitants.

Sites and monuments
The Chateau of Estresse (15th century) is registered as a historical monument.
The Parish Church of Saint-Etienne contains a Bronze Bell (1571) which is registered as a historical object.

See also
Communes of the Corrèze department

References

External links
Astaillac on the old IGN website 
Astaillac on Géoportail, National Geographic Institute (IGN) website 
Astaillac on the 1750 Cassini Map

Communes of Corrèze